Schrafft's was a candy, chocolate and cake company based in Sullivan Square, Charlestown, Massachusetts. In 1861 it introduced jelly beans to the United States and told the customers to send them off to civil war soldiers. The famous Schrafft's neon sign is a significant landmark in Boston, although the former factory it sits above, constructed in 1928, has been redeveloped for business accommodation. Schrafft's later expanded to form a chain of Schrafft's restaurants in New York, and a collection of motor inns and restaurants along the eastern seaboard from New England to Florida during the 1950s and 1960s.

History
Schrafft's was founded as a candy company by William F. Schrafft in Boston, in 1861. Frank Shattuck took over in 1898, expanding the company to include restaurants. By 1915, they had nine stores in Manhattan, one in Brooklyn, and one in Syracuse, NY, as well as the facility in Boston.  They had grown to 22 stores in 1923, 42 stores in 1934, and 55 stores in 1968.

Schrafft's sponsored the 1959 CBS telecast of The Wizard of Oz, the first of the film's annual telecasts (it had been shown once before on television in 1956).

PET milk purchased Schrafft's in 1967, breaking the ice cream, restaurant and cake, and candy operations into separate companies. The ice cream is produced under license by the company. Gulf+Western Industries acquired the candy operations in 1974.

In 1968, in an attempt to broaden their customer base, Schrafft's commissioned a 60-second television commercial from pop artist Andy Warhol.

Schrafft's was shut down by its parent company Gulf+Western in the 1980s.

The company's former candy factory in Boston was turned into commercial office space. Located at 529 Main Street, Charlestown, Massachusetts, it is known as the Schrafft Center and owned by the Flatley Company. Among its tenants are Business Valuation Resources, Boston Digital, Fitcorp, All IT Supported, Bright Horizons Family Solutions, Beacon Hospice, iCorps Technology, Mary Kay Cosmetics, Newton Scientific, Telemundo Boston, and the Massachusetts Department of Public Health.

In 2019, James Byrne, a godson of the Shattucks, the founding family of Schrafft's restaurants, announced the return of the brand with plans to open brick-and-mortar retail in the near term.

References

External links

 ADVERTISING; New Agency For Schrafft's
Food; Stolen Moments
When Everybody Ate at Schrafft's
ESL Academy Computer Systems Institute

1861 establishments in Massachusetts
American chocolate companies
Charlestown, Boston
Companies based in Boston
Companies established in 1861
Confectionery companies of the United States
Restaurants established in 1898
Restaurants in Boston